A rugged smartphone is a specific type of toughened smartphone which is designed to be completely sealed within a durable housing to protect it against damage from, among other things, water, shock, dust, and vibration.  Rugged smartphones are designed to survive extreme weather and temperatures, accidental damage, and rough handling; making them ideal for working outdoors, or in harsh environments, along with use during extreme sports, such as sailing, rock climbing, etc.  Most rugged smartphones will have been tested to tough IP68 standards.

However, not all waterproof smartphones will be ruggedised.

Classification
There are three general types of rugged phone:
Outdoor sports 
Military
Stylish

Functional requirements
The following IP code ratings for ingress protection (IP), as defined by the International Electrotechnical Commission (IEC) standard 60529 (equivalent to European standard EN 60529), are typically used for certifying various toughened and ruggedised smartphones.

Primary standard

Intermediate standard

Advanced (professional) standards
IP67 — solid particle (dust) protection level 6 (totally dust tight; full protection against dust and other particulates, including a vacuum seal, tested against continuous airflow), liquid ingress (waterproof) protection level 7 (Protection against full immersion for up to 30 minutes at depths between 15 cm and 1 metre.Limited ingress permitted with no harmful effects).

IP69K — in the IEC 60529 rating system for ingress protection (IP), IP6* refers to the product’s ability to resist ingress of dust.  The IP*9K refers to the product’s ability to resist ingress of high temperature (steam) / high pressure water.  If the device passes all these tests, then it can be considered as IP69K rated smartphone, and can be used in harsh environments with high pressure / steam cleaning.

Testing procedure per ISO 20653
The nozzle is held  from the tested device at angles of 0°, 30°, 60°, and 90°, for 30 seconds each.
The test device places on a turntable that rotates once every 12 seconds.

MIL-STD-810G
MIL-STD-810G is a U.S. military standard that stipulates a level of durability for an item of equipment.  Specifically, it means the equipment has been subjected to a series of twenty-nine (29) tests, including shock tests, vibration tests, and more.  This means it should be field ready, or even 'combat ready' in principle.  A lot of technology sold to the U.S. military must be MIL-STD-810G compliant.

List of rugged smartphones

Jesy J20

See also
Emerging technologies

References

Smartphones
Consumer electronics
Information appliances